Paul Hamilton Williams Jr. (born September 19, 1940) is an American composer, singer, songwriter, and actor. He is known for writing and co-writing popular songs performed by a number of acts in the 1970s, including Three Dog Night's "An Old Fashioned Love Song" and "Out in the Country", Helen Reddy's "You and Me Against the World", Biff Rose's "Fill Your Heart", and the Carpenters' "We've Only Just Begun" and "Rainy Days and Mondays".

Williams is also known for writing the score and lyrics for Bugsy Malone (1976) and his musical contributions to other films, including the Oscar-nominated song "Rainbow Connection" from The Muppet Movie, and writing the lyrics to the #1 chart-topping song "Evergreen", the love theme from the Barbra Streisand film A Star Is Born, for which he won a Grammy for Song of the Year and an Academy Award for Best Original Song. He wrote the lyrics to the opening theme for the television show The Love Boat, with music previously composed by Charles Fox, which was originally sung by Jack Jones and, later, by Dionne Warwick.

Williams had a variety of high-profile acting roles, such as Little Enos Burdette in the action-comedy Smokey and the Bandit (1977) and the villainous Swan in Brian De Palma's Phantom of the Paradise (1974), which Williams also co-scored, receiving an Oscar nomination in the process. Since 2009, Williams has been the president and chairman of the American songwriting society ASCAP.

Early life
Williams was born in Omaha, Nebraska, the son of Paul Hamilton Williams, an architectural engineer, and his wife, Bertha Mae (née Burnside), a homemaker.

One of his brothers was John S. Williams, a NASA rocket scientist, who participated in the Mercury and Apollo programs and was awarded the NASA Distinguished Service Medal, their highest honor, in 1969. His other brother was Mentor Williams, a songwriter as well who wrote Dobie Gray's 1973 hit "Drift Away".

Musical career

Williams began his professional songwriting career with Biff Rose in Los Angeles. The two men first met while working together on a television comedy show. Together, they wrote the song "Fill Your Heart" which was recorded by Rose on his first album, The Thorn in Mrs. Roses Side. Tiny Tim covered it as the B-side of his hit "Tiptoe Through the Tulips" (1968). David Bowie recorded a version of the song on his album Hunky Dory (1971). Rose and Williams wrote "I'll Walk Away" (recorded by Rose on his third, eponymous album). Rose was instrumental in getting Williams his break with A&M Records which resulted in Williams working with songwriter Roger Nichols. Williams and Nichols were responsible for a number of successful pop hits from the 1970s, including several hits for Three Dog Night ("An Old Fashioned Love Song", "The Family of Man" and "Out in the Country"), Helen Reddy ("You and Me Against the World"), and the Carpenters, most notably "Rainy Days and Mondays", "I Won't Last a Day Without You", and "We've Only Just Begun", originally a song for a Crocker National Bank television commercial featuring newlyweds, and which has since become a cover-band standard and de rigueur for weddings throughout North America.

An early collaboration with Roger Nichols, "Someday Man", was covered by the Monkees (a group for which he auditioned but was not chosen) on a 1969 single, and was the first Monkees' release not published by Screen Gems.

A frequent co-writer of Williams' was musician Kenneth Ascher. Their songs together included "Rainbow Connection", sung by Jim Henson (as Kermit the Frog) in The Muppet Movie (1979).

Williams worked on the music for a number of films, including writing and singing on Phantom of the Paradise (1974) in which he starred and earned an Oscar nomination for the music, and Bugsy Malone (1976). Williams wrote and sang the song "Where Do I Go from Here", which was used in the end credits of the film Thunderbolt and Lightfoot. He contributed lyrics to the Cinderella Liberty song "You're So Nice to Be Around" with music by John Williams, and it earned them an Oscar nomination. Along with Ascher and Rupert Holmes, he wrote the music and lyrics to A Star Is Born (also 1976), with Barbra Streisand and Kris Kristofferson. The love ballad, "Evergreen", (lyrics by Paul Williams, melody by Barbra Streisand) won the Academy Award for Best Original Song and a Grammy for Song of the Year. He has been nominated on other occasions for an Academy Award and several Golden Globe Awards.

In 1987 he wrote the songs performed by Dustin Hoffman and Warren Beatty in the film Ishtar.

He wrote the music for a musical production of Happy Days that debuted in 2007 and made a cameo appearance as an animated version of himself singing "Breathe in the Sunshine" in the animated series Dexter's Laboratory. He wrote and sang "What Would They Say", the theme song from the made-for-television film The Boy in the Plastic Bubble (1976).

Williams wrote music and lyrics of "Silence is Our Song" for Richard Barone's 2010 album Glow and collaborated with Scissor Sisters on their second album, Ta-Dah.

In March 2012, it was announced that Williams had "written a couple of tunes" on Random Access Memories, the album of French electronic duo Daft Punk. He co-wrote and sang vocals on "Touch" and co-wrote "Beyond". Williams and Nile Rodgers were the only featured artists to speak on behalf of Daft Punk at the 2014 Grammy Awards upon their receipt of the Album of the Year award for Random Access Memories. Williams told an anecdote about his work with Daft Punk: "Back when I was drinking, I would imagine things that weren't there and I'd get frightened. Then I got sober and two robots called and asked me to make an album." He communicated a "message from the robots" to the audience: "As elegant and as classy as the Grammy has ever been is the moment when we saw those wonderful marriages and ’Same Love’ is fantastic. It is the height of fairness and love and the power of love for all people at any time in any combination is what [Daft Punk] wanted me to say. Captain Kirk uses the Enterprise. [Daft Punk] sail on a ship called Generosity. They are generous in spirit ... This is a labor of love and we are all so grateful."

Williams is a member of the Songwriters Hall of Fame, and his songs have been performed by both pop and country music artists. In April 2009, Williams was elected President and Chairman of the American Society of Composers, Authors and Publishers (ASCAP).

In September 2015, Williams, along with bass player Kasim Sulton, led a global virtual songwriting collaboration at Hookist.com. The mission was to write the first crowd-sourced anthem to be performed at FacingAddiction.org's concert and rally on The National Mall on October 4, 2015, headlined by Steven Tyler, Sheryl Crow and Joe Walsh among others. The theme of the song was "Celebrate Recovery" and the goal was to reduce the stigma associated with addiction. Williams, Sulton and Dr. Mehmet Oz opened the show and led 10,000 people in a singalong of "Voice Of Change" at the base of the Washington Monument. Sulton led a singalong of the song on The Dr. Oz Show which went viral.

Film and television career
Although predominantly known for his music, Williams has appeared in films and many television guest spots, such as the Faustian record producer Swan in Brian DePalma's film Phantom of the Paradise (1974)—a rock and roll adaptation of The Phantom of the Opera, Faust, and The Picture of Dorian Gray, for which Williams wrote the songs—and as Virgil, the genius orangutan in Battle for the Planet of the Apes (1973).

On February 9, 1973, Williams made a joke appearance on The Tonight Show Starring Johnny Carson in which he sang a song in full make-up as Virgil. He played Migelito Loveless, Jr. in The Wild Wild West Revisited (1979), a reunion film featuring the original cast of the television series The Wild Wild West. He played himself, singing a song to Felix Unger's daughter Edna, on the television series The Odd Couple in 1974. He made his film debut as Gunther Fry in the satire The Loved One (1965).

After appearing on The Muppet Show in 1976, Williams worked closely with Jim Henson's Henson Productions on The Muppet Movie, working on the soundtrack and appearing in a cameo part as the piano player in the nightclub where Kermit meets Fozzie Bear. He was also the lyricist for Emmet Otter's Jug-Band Christmas.

Williams was hired by TV producers Paul Junger Witt and Tony Thomas to write title tracks for two of their ABC comedies, It Takes Two (1982–1983), on which he sang a duet with Crystal Gayle, and Condo (1983), in which Williams' theme was sung by Drake Frye. Williams composed and performed the theme to the McLean Stevenson sitcom The McLean Stevenson Show in 1976.

Williams composed, and sang "Flying Dreams" for the animated film The Secret of NIMH.

Williams has appeared in many minor roles. He provided the voice of the Penguin in Batman: The Animated Series. He appeared on an episode of Walker, Texas Ranger as a radio DJ covering a modern-day Bonnie and Clyde. He appeared in 2008 in an episode of Nickelodeon's children's show Yo Gabba Gabba! entitled "Weather", where he performed "Rainbow Connection". He has also appeared on Cartoon Network's Dexter's Laboratory where he played Professor Williams in an episode entitled "Just An Old Fashioned Lab Song".

He made numerous television appearances in the 1970s and 1980s, including on The Odd Couple, Hawaii Five-O, Match Game '79, Hollywood Squares, The Love Boat,Police Woman, Fantasy Island, The Hardy Boys, The Fall Guy, The Flip Wilson Special, Gimme A Break, and The Gong Show. He has also guest-starred in the Babylon 5 episode "Acts of Sacrifice" (Season 2 Episode 12) as Taq, the aide to Correlilmurzon, an alien ambassador whose species finalizes treaties and agreements by having sex with the other signees.

In October 1980, Williams was host of the Mickey Mouse Club 25th Anniversary Special on NBC-TV. He stated that he tried out for the show in early 1955 and was turned down. He was a frequent guest and performer on The Tonight Show Starring Johnny Carson. He appears as the man making the phone call at the beginning of the music video for Hank Williams Jr.'s song "All My Rowdy Friends Are Coming Over Tonight". In 2014, he appeared on Community as an illegal textbook dealer who declines to purchase a batch of misprinted chemistry textbooks. Williams appeared in the 2017 film Baby Driver as the Butcher, an arms dealer.

He portrayed the character of Little Enos Burdette in Smokey and the Bandit (1977), Smokey and the Bandit II (1980), and Smokey and the Bandit Part 3 (1983). He has a recurring role as a former lawyer and information source in 2018's season 2 and 2019's season 3 of Goliath.

Personal life
Williams has been married three times. He has two children, Sarah and Cole Williams (born 1981), from his first marriage (1971) to Kate Clinton. In 1993 he married Hilda Keenan Wynn, daughter of actor Keenan Wynn. His third wife is writer Mariana Williams.

An experienced skydiver, Williams completed over 100 jumps in the 1970s.

In September 2011, director Stephen Kessler's documentary Paul Williams Still Alive premiered at the Toronto International Film Festival.

Williams struggled with alcohol and substance abuse during the 1970s and 1980s. Sober since 1990, Williams has been active in the field of recovery from addictions and became a Certified Drug Rehabilitation Counselor through UCLA. In 2014, he co-authored Gratitude and Trust: Recovery is Not Just for Addicts, with Tracey Jackson.

Songwriting

Notable songs
 "Love Dance", (Williams provided the lyrics. Written with Ivan Lins and Victor Martins, it was recorded by Ivan Lins, Barbra Streisand, and Sarah Vaughan, among others. It is considered a jazz standard.)
 "Evergreen (Love Theme from A Star Is Born)", (#1 hit for Barbra Streisand - Billboard Hot 100)
 "I Won't Last a Day Without You", (#1 hit for Carpenters - Billboard Adult Contemporary)
 "Rainy Days and Mondays", (#1 hit for Carpenters - Billboard Adult Contemporary)
 "We've Only Just Begun" (#1 hit for Carpenters - Billboard Adult Contemporary)
 "The Family of Man" (US #12 & Canadian #5 hit for Three Dog Night)
"An Old Fashioned Love Song" (#4 hit for Three Dog Night)
 "Out in the Country" (#15 hit for Three Dog Night)
 "Talk It Over in the Morning" (Canadian #1 hit for Anne Murray)
 "You and Me Against the World" (US Easy Listening #1 hit for Helen Reddy)
 "Rainbow Connection" (Golden Globe and Oscar-nominated song, Entered into the US Library of Congress Archive, #25 hit for Kermit the Frog - Billboard Hot 100)
 "Flying Dreams" (from The Secret of NIMH soundtrack)
 "Let Me Be the One" (#18 U.S R&B chart hit for The Carpenters and Al Wilson)
 "Someday Man" (The Monkees – 1969 – "B" Side of "Listen to the Band" single)
 "Touch" (Daft Punk – 2013 – Random Access Memories)
 "You're Gone" (US Country #4 hit for Diamond Rio)

Notable recordings
 "The Family of Man" (from A Little Bit of Love [1974])
 "Out in the Country" (from Life Goes On [1972])

Scores

Films
 The Loved One (1965)
 Phantom of the Paradise (1974)
 Bugsy Malone (1976)
 Emmet Otter's Jug-Band Christmas (1977)
 Smokey and the Bandit (1977)
 The End (1978)
 The Muppet Movie (1979)
 The Night They Saved Christmas (1984)
 Ishtar (1987)
 The Muppet Christmas Carol (1992)
 The Princess Diaries 2: Royal Engagement (2004)

Theatre
 Bugsy Malone (1997)
 Happy Days (2007)
 Emmet Otter's Jug-Band Christmas (2008)

Notable songs written for film soundtracks
 "Where Do I Go From Here" (composed and performed by Williams for Thunderbolt and Lightfoot) (1974)
 "Evergreen (Love Song from A Star Is Born)" (lyrics written by Williams, Academy and Golden Globe winner for Best Original Song) (1976)
 "What Would They Say?" (for The Boy in the Plastic Bubble starring John Travolta and Diana Hyland) (1976)
 "Rainbow Connection" (co-composed by Williams for The Muppet Movie, 2020 National Recording Registry inductee) (1979)
 "Flying Dreams" (co-composed with Jerry Goldsmith and performed by Williams for The Secret of N.I.M.H) (1982)
 "When Love is Gone" (co-composed by Williams for The Muppet Christmas Carol) (1992)
 "If We Could Remember" (co-composed with Jerry Goldsmith for The Sum of All Fears) (2002)
 "Still Alive" (composed and performed by Williams for Paul Williams Still Alive) (2011)
 "I Love You Too Much" and "The Apology Song" (co-composed with Gustavo Santaolalla for The Book of Life) (2014)
 "Time and Tide" (composed by Paul Williams and performed by Dale Menten for Lifeguard) (1976)

Discography

Albums

Soundtracks

Compilations

Other releases
 The Holy Mackerel (with The Holy Mackerel) (1969)
 We've Only Just Begun (by Roger Nichols and Paul Williams) (2001)
 Random Access Memories (Daft Punk) (Williams features on two tracks) (2013)

Filmography

Film

Television

Legacy
The Rainbow Connection was inducted into the National Recording Registry in 2020.

References

Bibliography
 
 
 ASCAP (1980) The ASCAP Biographical Dictionary, 4th ed., p. 545  .
 Colin Larkin (ed.) (1992) The Guinness Encyclopedia of Popular Music, 1st ed., p. 2698,  .

External links

 Official website
 gratitudeandtrust.com, Williams blog on recovery]
 Paul Williams Still Alive, documentary
 
 
 

1940 births
Living people
American male composers
21st-century American composers
American male film actors
American soft rock musicians
American male television actors
American male voice actors
Best Original Song Academy Award-winning songwriters
Golden Globe Award-winning musicians
Grammy Award winners
Musicians from Omaha, Nebraska
American substance abuse counselors
University of California, Los Angeles alumni
A&M Records artists
American male singer-songwriters
American male pop singers
Wilson Classical High School alumni
Reprise Records artists
21st-century American male musicians
Singer-songwriters from Nebraska